Peter Gerald Trites (December 17, 1946 – May 13, 2010) was a former high school teacher and political figure in New Brunswick, Canada. He represented Saint John East in the Legislative Assembly of New Brunswick from 1984 to 1991 as a New Democratic Party and then Liberal member.

He was born in Moncton, New Brunswick, the son of Gerald L. Trites and Elizabeth P. Campbell. He was educated at the University of New Brunswick. In 1973, Trites married Deborah Smith. He was first elected to the provincial assembly as a member of the New Democratic Party in a 1984 by-election held after Gerald Merrithew resigned his seat to run for a seat in the House of Commons. He crossed the floor to sit as a Liberal prior to the 1987 election. Trites was named to the province's Executive Council as Minister of Housing in 1987. He declined to run for re-election in 1991.

In 1992, Trites was elected to Saint John City Council as a city councillor and served in that regard until 2004. In 2005, CBC Radio found that Trites was working at an Old Navy store in Saint John.

References 
 Canadian Parliamentary Guide, 1988, PG Normandin

1946 births
2010 deaths
Members of the Executive Council of New Brunswick
New Brunswick Liberal Association MLAs
New Brunswick New Democratic Party MLAs
People from Moncton
Saint John, New Brunswick city councillors